Empyrean Isles is the fourth studio album by American jazz pianist Herbie Hancock, recorded in 1964 for Blue Note Records. It features Hancock with his Miles Davis bandmates, bassist Ron Carter and drummer Tony Williams, along with trumpeter Freddie Hubbard.

Recording and music
The album was recorded at Van Gelder Studio, Englewood Cliffs, New Jersey, on June 17, 1964. Freddie Hubbard plays cornet rather than his typical trumpet. The four compositions are Hancock originals written over a two-year period.

Release and reception

Empyrean Isles was released by Blue Note Records. AllMusic reviewer Stephen Thomas Erlewine called it "a record that officially established Hancock as a major artist in his own right."

Track listing
All compositions by Herbie Hancock

Personnel
Herbie Hancock – piano
Freddie Hubbard – cornet
Ron Carter – bass
Tony Williams – drums

References

1964 albums
Blue Note Records albums
Herbie Hancock albums
Albums produced by Alfred Lion
Albums recorded at Van Gelder Studio
Hard bop albums
Modal jazz albums
Soul jazz albums